Willsboro is a hamlet and census-designated place (CDP) in the town of Willsboro in Essex County, New York, United States. The population of the CDP was 753 at the 2010 census, out of a total town population of 2,025.

Geography
Willsboro hamlet is located in the center of the town of Willsboro, along the Boquet River, a tributary of Lake Champlain. New York State Route 22 is the main road through the community, leading north  to Plattsburgh and south  to Westport.

Demographics

References

Census-designated places in New York (state)
Census-designated places in Essex County, New York